The pound (symbol £, £NZ. for distinction) was the currency of New Zealand from 1840 until 1967, when it was replaced by the New Zealand dollar. Like the pound sterling, it was subdivided into 20 shillings (abbreviation s or /) each of 12 pence (symbol d).

History

Up until the outbreak of the First World War, the New Zealand pound was at parity with one pound sterling.

As a result of the great depression of the early 1930s, the New Zealand agricultural export market to the UK was badly affected. Australian banks, which controlled the New Zealand exchanges with London, devalued the New Zealand pound to match the value of the Australian pound in 1933, from parity or £NZ 1 = £1 sterling to £NZ 1 = 16s sterling (£0.8). In 1948 it returned to parity with sterling or £NZ.1 = £1 sterling.

In 1967, New Zealand decimalised its currency, replacing the pound with the dollar at a rate of $NZ 2 = £NZ 1 (or $NZ 1 = 10/– NZ). In November of that year, the British government devalued sterling from £1 sterling = US$2.80 to US$2.40, but the New Zealand dollar was devalued even more from $NZ 1 = US$1.40 to US$1.12 in order to match the value of the Australian dollar.

Coins

Initially, British and Australian coins circulated in New Zealand. The devaluation of the New Zealand pound relative to sterling in the 1930s led to the issue of distinct New Zealand coins in 1933, in denominations of 3d, 6d, 1/– (one shilling), 2/– (or florin) and 2/6 (half-crown), minted in 50% silver until 1946 and in copper-nickel from 1947. In 1940, bronze d and 1d coins were introduced. All these denominations were the same size and weight as their equivalents in the Australian and UK coinage (although Australia never minted a half-crown). When the UK introduced the nickel-brass twelve sided threepenny bit, New Zealand continued to use the smaller silver coin until decimalisation in 1967.

Notes:

 The sixpence, shilling, and florin (2 shilling), although rarely seen in circulation, remained legal tender as late as 2006, being used as the identical size and value of its decimal successors: the 5c (cents), 10c, and 20c coins respectively. They were demonetised on 31 October 2006, when the 5c coin and the original 10c and 20c coins were withdrawn from circulation.

Commemorative crowns (full crowns, or five shillings, or two half crowns) were minted in 1935, 1949, and 1953 for the Treaty of Waitangi, a royal visit, and the coronation of Queen Elizabeth II, respectively.

Banknotes

Until 1934, private trading banks issued notes. The first bank notes were issued in New Zealand in March 1840 by the Union Bank of Australia at Britannia, now Wellington, then the New Zealand Banking Company followed in September 1840 at Kororareka, now Russell. These banks issued notes in New Zealand:

 Union Bank of Australia (March 1840 – July 1934)
 New Zealand Banking Company (September 1840 – January 1845)
 Colonial Bank of Issue (1847–1856)
 Otago Banking Company (unsuccessful issuer in 1851)
 Oriental Bank Corporation (1857 – May 1861)
 Bank of New South Wales (May 1861 – July 1934)
 Bank of New Zealand (October 1861 – July 1934)
 Commercial Bank of New Zealand (1863–1866)
 Bank of Australasia (1863 – July 1934)
 Bank of Auckland (December 1864 – June 1867)
 Bank of Otago (1864–1874)
 Colonial Bank of New Zealand (1873 – November 1895)
 National Bank of New Zealand (1874 – July 1934)
 Bank of Aotearoa (unsuccessful issuer c. 1886)
 Commercial Bank of Australia (1912 – July 1934)

Between 1852 and 1856, the Colonial Bank of Issue was the only banknote issuing body. Public distrust of these notes soon led to their redemption with Union Bank notes. The discovery of gold in 1861 encouraged competing banks into New Zealand leading to a variety of note issue. By 1924, public demand for convenience in usage led to the six remaining issuing banks agreeing a "Uniform" standard size and colour for each denomination.

When the Reserve Bank of New Zealand was established on 1 August 1934 by the Reserve Bank of New Zealand Act 1933, it became the sole issuer of notes. This government agency introduced notes for 10/–, £1, £5 and £50. In 1940, £10 notes were added. Only two series of £1 notes were printed. The first (1934–40) featured the portrait of Matutaera Te Pukepuke Te Paue Te Karato Te-a-Pōtatau Tāwhiao, the second (1940–67) featured Captain James Cook.

Notes in circulation when the dollar was introduced were:
10/– ($1)
£1 ($2)
£5 ($10)
£10 ($20)
£50 ($100)

Present status

Coins and uncancelled notes issued by the six private trading banks operating in 1934 as well as the Reserve Bank of New Zealand are still redeemable at the RBNZ offices in Wellington. The RBNZ has an obligation to redeem private bank notes. Under the 1933 Reserve Bank Act the privately held gold was confiscated and paid for in RBNZ banknotes.

In all cases, the currency's value to collectors is now far higher than its face value, due to its rarity. A prime example is a first issue Union Bank £1 from the 1840s returned to New Zealand in 1934, for redemption at face value, by its owner in the United States. Today a similar note would be valued in excess of £10,000 sterling. £NZ.50 notes of the Reserve Bank are also extremely rare and fetch a high price from collectors. The note signed by Chief Cashier T. P. Hanna in uncirculated condition could fetch as high as $NZ.25,000 according to the premier value listing for New Zealand notes and coins (some other lesser valued notes signed by Hanna exist).

Notes

References

 
 
 Hawke, G.R., "The Making of New Zealand: an Economic History" (1985)
 Grant. Anthony W., "Premier: the New Zealand Coin and Banknote Catalogue" 2011

External links

 New Zealand coins price guide and values (pre-decimal coins)

 Coins from New Zealand – Online Coin Club

History of New Zealand
Modern obsolete currencies
Currencies of the British Empire
Currencies of the Commonwealth of Nations
Currencies of New Zealand
Currencies with multiple banknote issuers
1840 establishments in New Zealand
1967 disestablishments in New Zealand
Colony of New Zealand
Currencies of the Cook Islands